The Estonian Footballer of the Year is an annual award given to the best performing Estonian footballer of the respective year. The award has been presented since 1992. From 1992 to 1994, the winner was chosen by Päevaleht, from 1995 to 2000 by Eesti Päevaleht, and from 2002 to 2003 by Estonian football journalists (EJAK). The Estonian Football Association (EJL) also named their player of the year from 1994 to 2003. Since 2004, the winner is chosen by representatives of the Estonian Football Association and football journalists. Ragnar Klavan has won the award a record seven times. The current holder is Joonas Tamm.

Winners

See also

 Estonian Female Footballer of the Year
 Estonian Young Footballer of the Year
 Estonian Female Young Footballer of the Year
 Meistriliiga Player of the Year
 Naiste Meistriliiga Player of the Year
 Esiliiga Player of the Year
 Esiliiga B Player of the Year
 Estonian Silverball

References

External links
 

 
Estonia
Awards established in 1992
Lists of Estonian sportspeople
Estonian sports trophies and awards
1992 establishments in Estonia
Association football player non-biographical articles
Association football in Estonia lists